The Pizzo dell'Alpe Gelato is a mountain in the Lepontine Alps on the Swiss-Italian border.

External links
 List of mountains above 2000 m in Switzerland with coordinates

Lepontine Alps
Mountains of the Alps
Mountains of Piedmont
Mountains of Ticino
Italy–Switzerland border
International mountains of Europe
Mountains of Switzerland